Russell Francis Madden (1922-1987) was an Australian rugby league footballer who played in the 1940s.

Madden came up from Wollongong, New South Wales to join St. George for two seasons.

He returned to Wollongong to get married at the end of 1945 and retired from the NSWRFL.

Madden died on 8 January 1987 in Karratha, Western Australia.

References

St. George Dragons players
Australian rugby league players
Rugby league second-rows
1922 births
1987 deaths